Legrome Derek Davis (born 1952) is an inactive Senior United States district judge of the United States District Court for the Eastern District of Pennsylvania.

Education and career

Born in Columbus, Ohio, Davis received a Bachelor of Arts degree from Princeton University in 1973 and a Juris Doctor from Rutgers School of Law - Camden in 1976. Davis was an assistant district attorney in Philadelphia from 1977 to 1980.  After leaving the D.A.'s office Judge Davis spent a year as an attorney for the Pennsylvania Crime Commission.  He returned to the D.A.'s office from 1981 to 1987, before spending a year in the general counsel's office at the University of Pennsylvania. He was briefly in private practice in Pennsylvania in 1987. He was elected a judge on the court of common pleas in Philadelphia, where he served from 1987 to 2002.

Federal judicial service

On January 23, 2002, Davis was nominated by President George W. Bush to a seat on the United States District Court for the Eastern District of Pennsylvania vacated by Edmund V. Ludwig. Davis was confirmed by the United States Senate on April 18, 2002, and received commission on April 23, 2002. He assumed senior status on September 28, 2017.

See also 
 List of African-American federal judges
 List of African-American jurists

References

External links

1952 births
Living people
Princeton University alumni
Rutgers School of Law–Camden alumni
African-American judges
Judges of the Pennsylvania Courts of Common Pleas
Judges of the United States District Court for the Eastern District of Pennsylvania
United States district court judges appointed by George W. Bush
21st-century American judges
Lawyers from Columbus, Ohio